NAIS can mean:

National Animal Identification System in the US to assist tracking of animals in the food chain
National Association of Independent Schools in the USA
Nord Anglia International School Dubai, also known as NAS Dubai, an international school located in Dubai.
Nord Anglia International School Pudong
upper sideband, an amplitude modulation transmission method by radio
NASA Acquisition Internet Service, web access to current acquisition information

See also
Nais (disambiguation)